Stone Cottage and The Smokehouse are two exhibit buildings at Shelburne Museum in Shelburne, Vermont.

Stone Cottage 

Built about 1840 in South Burlington, Vermont, Stone Cottage originally functioned as home to a family of five, including two children and an elderly parent. In later years the building served first as a school and then as a blacksmith shop. Constructed of limestone, the cottage’s stone exterior was laid in straight courses rather than in the more common scatterstone technique, creating lending the exterior walls an even, harmonious pattern.

Relocation 
When the Shelburne Museum purchased the cottage in 1947, only the exterior shell remained. When the Museum moved the structure to the grounds two years later, staff members numbered each stone individually before transporting the cottage piece by piece to reassemble it in its present location. By luck a direct descendant of the original occupants heard about the project. Her recollections of the interior enabled Museum staff to duplicate the original floor plan and furnishings, including the wrought-iron door latch that she had removed years before when the building began to slip into ruin. The restoration of the cottage made use of old beams and materials from local abandoned barns and homes. The furniture, textiles, and household goods exhibited in Stone Cottage evoke the simple lifestyle of agricultural workers in the mid-19th century.

The Smokehouse 

Smokehouses, similar to the one behind Stone Cottage, which was built in Charlotte, Vermont in 1820, were a staple of American farm life and remained in common use until the late 19th century. Typically small stone structures with dirt floors, smokehouses possessed a confined interior chamber that enabled farmers to easily preserve meat. As such, the major structural requirement of a smokehouse was that the building be airtight, although chimneys and small vents were sometimes installed to regulate the density of smoke. Traditionally, farmers would soak butchered cuts in brine and then hang them in their smokehouse above a smoldering fire of corncobs and hickory wood, giving the meat its distinctive flavor. Meats remained in place for several days, or sometimes weeks, to complete the process.

See also 
 Shelburne Museum
 Smokehouse

References 

Shelburne Museum
Houses in Chittenden County, Vermont
Relocated buildings and structures in Vermont
Smokehouses